Jade Bailey may refer to:

 Jade Bailey (athlete) (born 1983), Barbadian track and field sprint athlete
 Jade Bailey (footballer) (born 1995), Jamaican footballer